"Free Man" is a 1975 song by South Shore Commission. The song went to number one for one week on the Billboard disco/dance chart. The single also peaked at #61 on the Billboard Hot 100 and #9 on the R&B chart.

"Free Man" was written by Bunny Sigler and Ronnie Tyson and produced by Sigler.

References

1975 singles
1975 songs
Disco songs
Songs written by Bunny Sigler
Wand Records singles